Karra may refer to: 

 Karra River, a river in Makawanpur district of Bagmati Province, Nepal 
 Karra block, a community development block in Khunti district, Jharkhand, India 
 Karra, Khunti, a village in Jharkhand, India
 Karra (name)

See also

Kaira (disambiguation)
Karma (disambiguation)
Karna (disambiguation)
 Karrar (disambiguation)
Karta (disambiguation)
Kasra (disambiguation)
Korra (disambiguation)